Dragonette is the stage name of Canadian singer-songwriter Martina Sorbara. Originally an electronic music band from Toronto, Ontario, formed in 2005, the band consisted of Sorbara with her husband Dan Kurtz as bassist and producer (also in The New Deal) and drummer Joel Stouffer.

Dragonette released a self-titled EP in 2005 before being signed to Mercury Records and relocating to London, where they recorded and released their debut studio album, Galore, in August 2007 to moderate critical appreciation. A second studio album, Fixin to Thrill, was released in September 2009. The group's third studio album, Bodyparts, was released in September 2012 and their fourth, Royal Blues, followed in November 2016.

They performed as a group until 2016, when both Kurtz and Stouffer left the band, with Sorbara continuing under the Dragonette moniker as a solo act. 

Dragonette's fifth album, Twennies (and the first as a solo act) was released in October 2022.

History

2005–2008: Formation and Galore
Sorbara and Kurtz met at a Canadian music festival and formed a duo named The Fuzz, making music together in their basement recording studio for fun. The duo formed Dragonette after these initial recordings, and supported New Order on only their second live performance. In 2005, the band released the six-track Dragonette EP, prior to signing a record deal with UK record label Mercury Records.

Dragonette relocated to London to record their debut studio album, Galore, released on August 6, 2007, and toured the UK supporting local acts, including Basement Jaxx (with whom Sorbara also recorded the track "Take Me Back to Your House") and Sugababes and played headline gigs in small venues across the UK and Canada. British musician Will Stapleton replaced Simon Craig on guitar following the relocation. Dragonette filmed two music videos, one for "Jesus Doesn't Love Me" and another for "I Get Around". The former video leaked onto the Internet, while the other served as promotion for their first single release. "I Get Around" reached number 92 on the UK Singles Chart. A follow-up single release, "Take It Like a Man", fared no better, failing to enter the top 100 of the UK Singles Chart. "I Get Around" was released in the band's home country of Canada where it outperformed the UK release, peaking at number 57 on Billboards Canadian Hot 100. After Galore failed to sell as expected, Dragonette parted ways with Mercury Records.

Dragonette received a nomination for New Group of the Year at the Juno Awards of 2008. Kurtz and Sorbara co-wrote and co-produced the song "Grab a Hold" for Cyndi Lauper's 2008 album Bring Ya to the Brink. That same year Will James Stapleton left the band, to be replaced by Chris Huggett.

2009–2011: Fixin to Thrill and collaborations
Dragonette's second studio album, Fixin to Thrill, was released on September 29, 2009. The album was nominated for Dance Recording of the Year at the Juno Awards of 2011.

Dragonette have collaborated with several house DJs for releases, to varying degrees of success. Although Basement Jaxx's 2006 song "Take Me Back to Your House" only featured Sorbara on vocals, it was promoted by the band as a Dragonette collaborative. The band have since recorded several tracks with French DJ Martin Solveig, including "Boys & Girls" in 2009, "Hello" in 2010, and "Can't Stop" and "Big in Japan" in 2011; all of these tracks appear on Solveig's 2011 album Smash. Solveig and Dragonette won the Juno Award for Dance Recording of the Year for "Hello" in April 2012. In 2010, the band also collaborated with Kaskade on "Fire in Your New Shoes" and with Don Diablo on "Animale".

A double A-side single containing the songs "Our Summer" and "Volcano" was released digitally on July 27, 2010. On August 3, 2010, Dragonette released the compilation album Mixin to Thrill digitally, while a limited-edition CD was sold via the band's online store. The compilation contains three new songs—"Volcano", "Our Summer", and "My Things"—as well as several remixes from the previous year. In 2011, Dragonette worked with Girls Aloud member Nicola Roberts, co-writing and producing the single "Lucky Day" for her debut solo album Cinderella's Eyes.

2012–2013: Bodyparts
On June 21, 2012, Dragonette announced the title of their third studio album, Bodyparts, which was released on September 22, 2012. The album's lead single "Let It Go" was released on April 2, 2012. "Rocket Ship", a track from the album, was made available as a free download on the band's official SoundCloud page. The album's second single, "Live in This City", was released on August 7, 2012.

In February 2013, Dragonette recorded a version of "Won't You Be My Neighbour?", the theme song to the American children's television series Mister Rogers' Neighborhood, for use in Target Canada's first ad campaign.

2014–2017: Royal Blues
In 2014, Dragonette collaborated with Dutch producer and DJ Mike Mago on the single "Outlines". The band also released the single "Let the Night Fall" on June 16, 2015. The band's fourth studio album, Royal Blues, was released on November 11, 2016.

During the promotion of Royal Blues, Sorbara and Kurtz revealed that they had separated in 2013, shortly after performing at the ET Canada New Year's Eve Show.

2020-present: Solo singles and Twennies 
In October 2020, Dragonette released cover version of Sam Roberts Band song "We're All In This Together". 

In 2021, Dragonette featured on a number of singles including "Phantom" with Gianni Kosta; "Summer Thing" with Sunnery James & Ryan Marciano; and "Slow Song" with The Knocks.

In August 2022, Dragonette released "New Suit", which would become the lead single from her fifth album Twennies, released in October 2022.

Discography

Studio albums

Compilation albums

Extended plays

Singles

As lead artist

As featured artist

Promotional singles

Guest appearances

Music videos

See also
 List of songs recorded by Dragonette

Notes

References

External links

 
 

2005 establishments in Ontario
Canadian dance music groups
Canadian musical trios
Canadian new wave musical groups
Canadian synthpop groups
Dance-rock musical groups
Electropop groups
Juno Award for Dance Recording of the Year winners
Mercury Records artists
Musical groups established in 2005
Musical groups from Toronto